Paolo Andreucci (born 21 April 1965) is an Italian rally driver. He won Rally Sanremo in IRC twice and 11 times Italian Rally Champion.

His co-driver Anna Andreussi is also his wife.

Career results

WRC results

IRC results

Other results
 Italian Rally Championship
11 wins (2001, 2003, 2006, 2009, 2010, 2011, 2012, 2014, 2015, 2017, 2018)

References

External links
 
 Profile at ewrc-results.com

1965 births
Living people
Italian rally drivers
World Rally Championship drivers
European Rally Championship drivers
Intercontinental Rally Challenge drivers